"Cowboys Like Us" is a song written by Bob DiPiero and Anthony Smith, and recorded by American country music artist George Strait.  It was released in August 2003 as the second single from his album Honkytonkville.  It reached number 2 on the Billboard Hot Country Singles & Tracks (now Hot Country Songs) charts.

Content
The song is a ballad about cowboys who "ride out on steel horses with wheels" (motorcycles).

Critical reception
Thom Jurek reviewed the song favorably, saying that it could signal a return to outlaw country.

Chart positions
"Cowboys Like Us" debuted at number 57 on the U.S. Billboard Hot Country Singles & Tracks for the week of August 9, 2003. It reached number 2 on the country chart dated December 13, 2003, behind Toby Keith's "I Love This Bar".

Year-end charts

Certifications

References

2003 singles
George Strait songs
Songs written by Bob DiPiero
Songs written by Anthony Smith (singer)
Song recordings produced by Tony Brown (record producer)
MCA Nashville Records singles
2003 songs
Songs about cowboys and cowgirls